Pieter Hermias Cornelius 'Lappies' Labuschagné (Japanese ピーター・ハーミアス・コーネリアス "ラピース"・ラブスカフニ; Pītā Hāmiasu Kōneriasu "Rapīsu" Rabusukafuni; born 11 January 1989) is a South African rugby union footballer who regularly plays as a flanker. He represents  at international level having satisfied residency requirements.

Career

Labuschagné moved to the Japanese Top League prior to the 2016–17 season, signing with the Kubota Spears.

International

In 2019, he debuted for Japan. He represented Japan at the 2019 Rugby World Cup and captained them in their Pool A victory over Ireland.

References

External links

Living people
1989 births
South African rugby union players
Rugby union flankers
Cheetahs (rugby union) players
Free State Cheetahs players
Afrikaner people
Alumni of Grey College, Bloemfontein
University of the Free State alumni
Rugby union players from Pretoria
Kubota Spears Funabashi Tokyo Bay players
South African expatriate rugby union players
Expatriate rugby union players in Japan
South African expatriate sportspeople in Japan
Japan international rugby union players
Sunwolves players
Bulls (rugby union) players
Blue Bulls players